Montana  is a state in the Western United States. The western third of Montana contains numerous mountain ranges. Smaller, "island ranges" are found in the central third of the state, for a total of 77 named ranges of the Rocky Mountains. This geographical fact is reflected in the state's name, derived from the Spanish word  (mountain). Montana has several nicknames, none official, including: "The Treasure State" and "Big Sky Country", and slogans that include "Land of the Shining Mountains" and more recently, "The Last Best Place". The state ranks fourth in area, but 44th in population, and accordingly has the third-lowest population density in the United States. The economy is primarily based on services, with ranching, wheat farming, oil and coal mining in the east, and lumber, tourism, and hard rock mining in the west. Millions of tourists annually visit Glacier National Park, the Little Bighorn Battlefield National Monument, and three of the five entrances to Yellowstone National Park.

A number of Montanans have become notable for their involvement in acting, animation, directing, classical music, rock music, and opera. Actors include Gary Cooper, who won Academy Awards for Sergeant York (1942) and High Noon (1952), and Myrna Loy, who won a lifetime achievement Academy Award in 1991. Martha Raye was an entertainer who was a strong supporter of, and much beloved by, members of the United States military. Animator Brad Bird won Academy Awards for The Incredibles (2004) and Ratatouille (2007). Director David Lynch has been nominated for four Academy Awards. Jeff Ament is the bassist for Pearl Jam. Soprano Judith Blegen is a member of New York's Metropolitan Opera.

Entertainment and performing arts

Film and TV

Actors

Adult entertainers

Directors

Other film and TV entertainers

Musicians

Other entertainers

References

External links
 Montana Historical Society's list of famous Montanans

Entertainers
Montana
P